Achille Philip, (born October 12, 1878, Arles - November 12, 1959, Béziers) was a French organist and composer.

Biography

A pupil of the Conservatoire de Marseille in 1888, Philip won the first prize for solfeggio in 1894, piano in 1896 and harmony in 1898.  In October 1898, Philip entered the Conservatory of Paris where he studied organ with Alexandre Guilmant (1837-1911) and composition with Charles Lenepveu (1840-1910). Philip won first prize in counterpoint and fugue in 1904.

From 1904 to 1913 Philip was the organist of the choir of the Madeleine church in Paris. From 1904 to 1950 he was professor of organ and harmony at the Schola Cantorum in Paris . Philip also presided over the organs of:

Saint-Jacques-du-Haut-Pas (1913-1928),
 St. Leon (1928-1949),
 St. Francis Xavier (1941-1946)
Val-de-Grâce (1913-1950) (where each year he gave the St. John Passion and St. Matthew Passion of Bach, as well as Mozart's Requiem).

On August 3, 1935, Philip created Bacchus at the Théâtre des Arenes in Béziers. In 1950, he settled in Béziers where he was appointed on March 31, 1957, as the organist of the Basilique Saint-Aphrodise.

Philip married the singer Marthe Legrand with whom he founded the "Quatuor Français". After the death of his wife, he married Louise Gant

Works

Sacred music

Organ
 Prélude et Fugue (1902)
 Adagio et Fugue (1904)
 Lied (1911)
 Pièce en si mineur (1911)
 Toccata et Fugue en la mineur pour orgue, Durand, Paris (1913).
 Variations sur le noël «Il est né le divin enfant»
 Cinq Petites Pièces Faciles sur des Noëls Provençaux
 Postlude: Carillons

Vocal
 Tantum ergo (en mi bémol majeur) (1901)
 Psaume CXVI (Laudate Dominum) pour chœur à 4 voix mixtes et 2 orgues (édition de la Schola Cantorum "Répertoire moderne de la Musique Vocale") 1902
 Tu es Petrus pour chœur à quatre voix mixtes et deux orgues (1935)
 Diffusa est (1936)
 Trois Tantum ergo (avril 1947) (Editions Musicales de la Schola Cantorum)
 Notre Père qui êtes aux cieux pour Baryton ou Mezzo-soprano et Orgue (édition L. Philippo 1954
 Ave verum pour chœur à quatre voix mixtes avec accompagnement d'orgue ad libitum

Chamber music
 2e Sonate en ut dièse mineur pour violon et piano, Édition Mutuelle, Paris (1908)

Orchestral
 Au pays basque (1909)
 Les Djinns (1913)
 Dans un parc enchanté (1917)
 Fantaisie pastorale (1919)
 Nymphes et Naïades (1920)

Lyric theater
 L'Or du Menhir (1934)
 Bacchus (1935)

Also: 45 motets, 3 masses, 30 melodies

Sheet music
 Free scores of Achille Philip on the International Music Score Library Project
 11 Christmas harmonies with 4 mixed voices on Scribd  [archive].

References
 Marc Honegger, Dictionnaire de la Musique - Les Hommes et leurs Œuvres, Paris, Bordas, 1970.
 Alex et Janine Béges: Achille Philip, organiste et compositeur, Béziers, Société de Musicologie du Languedoc, 1980.
 Fonds de partitions de l'église Saint François Xavier

1878 births
1959 deaths
People from Arles
20th-century French composers
French classical composers
French male classical composers
French classical organists
French male organists
20th-century French male musicians
Male classical organists